Damián Zepeda Vidales (born 17 November 1978) is a Mexican politician affiliated with the PAN. As of 2013 he served as Deputy of the LXII Legislature of the Mexican Congress representing Sonora. In December 2017, he was selected as the new President of PAN after Ricardo Anaya Cortés resigned to run in the 2018 presidential election; he served as President of PAN until August 2018.

References

1978 births
Living people
People from Hermosillo
Politicians from Sonora
Members of the Chamber of Deputies (Mexico) for Sonora
National Action Party (Mexico) politicians
21st-century Mexican politicians
Universidad de Sonora alumni
Members of the Congress of Sonora
Deputies of the LXII Legislature of Mexico
Members of the Senate of the Republic (Mexico)